The 2018–19 season was Al-Hazem's 62nd season in their existence and their seventh in the Saudi Professional League. Al-Hazem were promoted to the top tier of Saudi football for the first time since 2011 during the 2017–18 season. Along with competing in the Pro League, the club also participated in the King Cup.

The season covers the period from 1 July 2018 to 30 June 2019.

Players

Squad information

Transfers

In

Loans in

Out

Loans out

Pre-season friendlies

Competitions

Overall

Last Updated: 16 May 2019

Saudi Pro League

League table

Results summary

Results by round

Matches
All times are local, AST (UTC+3).

Relegation play-offs

King Cup

All times are local, AST (UTC+3).

Statistics

Squad statistics

Last updated on 16 May 2019.

|-
! colspan=14 style=background:#dcdcdc; text-align:center|Goalkeepers

|-
! colspan=14 style=background:#dcdcdc; text-align:center|Defenders

|-
! colspan=14 style=background:#dcdcdc; text-align:center|Midfielders

|-
! colspan=14 style=background:#dcdcdc; text-align:center|Forwards

|-
! colspan=14 style=background:#dcdcdc; text-align:center| Players sent out on loan this season

|-
! colspan=14 style=background:#dcdcdc; text-align:center| Player who made an appearance this season but have left the club

|-
|}

Goalscorers

Last Updated: 24 May 2019

Assists

Last Updated: 16 May 2019

Clean sheets

Last Updated: 20 May 2019

References

Al-Hazem F.C. seasons
Hazem